The Kakinomoto clan (柿本氏 Kakinomoto-uji) was a Japanese noble family particularly active in the Yamato period. It was the clan of the famous Asuka-Nara poet Kakinomoto no Hitomaro.

History

Legendary origins and parent clan 
The Shinsen Shōjiroku records that the clan, along with others such as the Ōyake, Awata and Ono (ja) clans had split from the earlier , a branch of the Wani clan, and that they were natives of Yamato Province who had adopted the name "Kakinomoto" during the reign of Emperor Bidatsu in the late sixth century. Centred in the northeastern part of the Nara Basin, the Wani clan had furnished many imperial consorts in the fourth through sixth centuries, and extended their influence from Yamato Province to Yamashiro, Ōmi, Tanba and Harima provinces. Many of their clan traditions (including genealogies, songs, and tales) are preserved in the Nihon Shoki and, especially, the Kojiki.

Home region 
Since their cousins in the main Wani clan were also based in this area, Watase speculates that the Kakinomoto clan had a particularly close relationship with the Wani clan.

Seventh and eighth centuries 
The Kakinomoto clan had their hereditary title promoted from Omi to Ason in the eleventh month (see Japanese calendar) of 684. According to the Nihon Shoki, Kakinomoto no Saru, the probable head of the clan, had been among ten people appointed , equivalent to Junior Fifth Rank, in the twelfth month of 681. These facts lead Watase to conjecture that the Kakinomoto clan may have had some literary success in the court of Emperor Tenmu. According to the Shoku Nihongi, Saru died in 708, having attained the Junior Fourth Rank, Lower Grade.

The famous seventh-century poet Kakinomoto no Hitomaro was born into this clan. There are several theories regarding the relationship of Hitomaro to Kakinomoto no Saru, including Saru being Hitomaro's father, brother or uncle, or them being the same person. The theory that they were the same person has been advanced by Takeshi Umehara, but has little supporting evidence. While the other theories cannot be confirmed, it is certain that they were members of the same clan (probably close relatives), and were active at the same time. It is likely that their mutual activity at court had a significant effect on the fortunes of the clan, and on each other.

Notes

References

Works cited 

 
 

Japanese clans